Camp Washington Chili is a Cincinnati chili parlor founded in 1940 by Steve Andon and Fred Zannbus in the neighborhood of Camp Washington, near downtown Cincinnati, in southwestern Ohio. A well known Cincinnati landmark, the parlor is located at 3005 Colerain Avenue, and the current owner is the Greek-born John Johnson. The restaurant left its old location and moved to a site a few lots away in 2000, after being told to vacate by the city in order to widen Hopple Street.  Their new location is modeled after a 1950s-style diner.  The restaurant is open 24 hours a day every day but Sunday.

In 2011, Camp Washington Chili was featured on a Cincinnati episode of the Travel Channel's Man v. Food Nation.

Reception

In 2009, food writers Jane and Michael Stern wrote of Camp Washington Chili that "when we crave the best, there is just one place to go." In a New York Times interview, the Sterns declared it the best maker of Cincinnati five-way chili. In 2014, Travel + Leisure named it one of "America's Best Chili(s)".  Bon Appétit named it one of "The Best Chili Spots." In 2000, the chili served by the restaurant won an "American Regional Classic" James Beard Foundation Award. CBS News in 1985 named it "the best chili in the nation." The restaurant has been featured by HGTV, the Huffington Post, and Every Day with Rachael Ray.

In popular culture
Blues musician Lonnie Mack wrote a song entitled "Camp Washington Chili".

See also
 Skyline Chili
 Gold Star Chili
 Dixie Chili and Deli
 Cincinnati cuisine

References

External links
Camp Washington Chili official website

Restaurants in Cincinnati
Companies based in Cincinnati
Restaurants established in 1940
Cuisine of Cincinnati
James Beard Foundation Award winners
1940 establishments in Ohio